Cedar is an unincorporated community and census-designated place in Leelanau County in the U.S. State of Michigan. The CDP had a population of 102 at the 2020 census. The town is known for its Polish heritage, and is home to an annual polka festival.

As an unincorporated community, Cedar has no legal autonomy of its own. However, it does have its own post office with the 49621 ZIP Code.

Geography

Demographics

With 95 residents and a typical age of 27.1 in 2020, Cedar, Michigan had a median family income of $43,750. The population of Cedar, Michigan decreased from 106 to 95 between 2019 and 2020, a 10.4% decrease, and its median household income increased from $43,750 to $57,500, a 31.4% increase between 2020 and 2021.

White (Non-Hispanic) (87.4%), White (Hispanic) (12.6%), Black or African American (Non-Hispanic) (0%), Black or African American (Hispanic) (0%), and American Indian & Alaska Native (Non-Hispanic) (0%) make up Cedar, Michigan's top 5 ethnic groupings.

History
Cedar was founded in approximately 1885 by lumberman Benjamin Boughey. He named it Cedar City due to its location in a cedar forest. The depot on the Manistee and North-Eastern Railroad continued to be known as Cedar City, long after the post office named simply Cedar was established on August 15, 1893.

References

Unincorporated communities in Leelanau County, Michigan
Unincorporated communities in Michigan
Census-designated places in Leelanau County, Michigan
Census-designated places in Michigan
Populated places established in 1885
1885 establishments in Michigan